Unpacking may refer to:

 Unpacking (linguistics), the separation of the features of a segment into distinct segments
 Unpacking (video game), a 2021 puzzle game
Unpacking (computer science), unpacking programming variables

See also 
 
 
 Pack (disambiguation)
 Packing (disambiguation)